Polecat Creek Bridge is a stone arch bridge, in Kansas, United States. It is built of Kansas limestone, crossing Polecat Creek, a clear water creek, and is located in the southwest corner of Butler County, Kansas, two miles from Sedgwick County, Kansas on SW Butler Road. It was opened for traffic in 1901 and is included on the National Register of Historic Places in Butler County, Kansas.

Directions: From Wichita, Kansas head east on Highway 54/400 (Kellogg Avenue). One mile east of the Butler County line, turn south on Andover Rd. towards Rose Hill, Kansas. After 5 miles, Andover Rd. becomes SW Butler Rd.. Continue on SW Butler Rd. through Rose Hill to 230th St.. Polecat Creek Bridge is one and one half miles east on the gravel road.

References 

Bridges completed in 1901
Road bridges on the National Register of Historic Places in Kansas
Buildings and structures in Butler County, Kansas
National Register of Historic Places in Butler County, Kansas
Stone arch bridges in the United States